This is a list of medalists from the ICF Canoe Slalom World Championships in mixed canoe.

C2
Debuted: 1955. Not held: 1979. Reinstated: 1981. Discontinued: 1981. Reinstated: 2017.

Medal table

C2 team
Debuted: 1957. Not held: 1959–63. Reinstated: 1965. Not held: 1967. Reinstated: 1969. Discontinued: 1969.

Medal table

References
World Championship results archive